We Are Lady Parts is a British television sitcom created, written, and directed by Nida Manzoor. The series follows an eponymous British punk rock band that consists entirely of Muslim women.

After airing as a pilot on 21 December 2018 on Channel 4, it was commissioned for a six-episode series; which premiered 20 May 2021. The show has been nominated for awards including two prizes at the Gotham Awards and a Rose d'Or award. In November 2021, creator Nida Manzoor received the Rose D'Or Emerging Talent Award for her work on the show.

Premise
An all-female Muslim punk band in the UK takes inspiration from London's rich and diverse collection of cultures. Friendships, relationships and cultural differences are navigated as the band seeks musical success.

Cast
 Anjana Vasan as Amina, a microbiology PhD student who is Lady Parts' new lead guitar player
 Sarah Kameela Impey as Saira, Lady Parts' leader, main singer and rhythm guitar player
 Juliette Motamed as Ayesha, Lady Parts' drummer
 Faith Omole as Bisma, Lady Parts' bass player
 Lucie Shorthouse as Momtaz, Lady Parts' manager
 Aiysha Hart as Noor, Amina's best friend
 Zaqi Ismail as Ahsan, Ayesha's brother and Amina's crush
 David Avery as Abdullah, Saira's boyfriend
 Shobu Kapoor as Seema, Amina's mother
 Sofia Barclay as Zarina, influencer and magazine culture editor

Episodes

Pilot (2018)

Series 1 (2021)

Production
Lady Parts was first ordered as a pilot for Channel 4's "Comedy Blaps" strand in mid 2018. The pilot premiered late same year.

The commissioned series contains both original punk songs and cover tracks, written and adapted by Nida Manzoor and her siblings Shez Manzoor (who also scored the show), Sanya Manzoor and Benni Fregin. The actors in the show all play their own instruments, although some had to learn specifically in order to perform on the show. Manzoor explained that "the band's music is such an intrinsic part of the show. Through the music, we see the characters in their element and singing their truth, capturing them in all their joy and silliness. This soundtrack is best enjoyed turned up to eleven, headbanging alone in one's bedroom."

In November 2021, Peacock and Channel 4 announced that a second series had been commissioned.

Broadcast
We Are Lady Parts premiered on Channel 4 television on 20 May 2021, with all episodes simultaneously becoming available for streaming on All 4.

International broadcast 
The series premiered on 21 May 2021 on Stan (Australia) and Sky New Zealand. The series premiered on Peacock in the United States on 3 June and premiered on Showcase in Canada on 9 June.

Reception

Ratings 
On Rotten Tomatoes, the series has a score of 100% based on 32 critics with an average rating of 7.96 out of 10. The critical consensus reads, "Infectious energy, great songs, and a magnetic cast come together to make We Are Lady Parts a rocking comedy that is as subversive as it is hilarious." On Metacritic, the series has a score of 83 out of 100 based on 17 reviews indicating "universal acclaim".

Critical reception 
Radhika Seth from Vogue described the series as a "riotous comedy that's unlike anything you've seen before"; they stated that it "hinges on a quintet of note-perfect performances". The Financial Times discussed that "progressive representations highlight a truth about being a modern-day Muslim: you can be both God-fearing and weed-smoking; disorderly and devotional. Far from a clash, these things reflect a cultural mish-mash of the tangled and contradictory parts of ourselves that make us delightfully, bafflingly human", and "We Are Lady Parts is among a wave of shows casting off stereotypes and at ease with complexity... The well-worn trope of oppressed Muslim women is nowhere to be seen among these tattooed, anarchic rebels, who are, nevertheless, practising Muslims. When they're not prostrating in prayer, they are ripping through provocative punk anthems such as 'Nobody's Gonna Honour Kill My Sister But Me'". The Guardian said: "We Are Lady Partss writing is pleasingly knowing. By the end of the first few episodes, a litany of Muslim stereotypes have been poked fun at... What is particularly striking is how refreshingly cheerful it all is. The series is reminiscent of the Canadian sitcom Schitt's Creek and the joy it spread for showing a same-sex couple without the constant terror of homophobia... We Are Lady Parts does something that many diverse shows have not: it delivers on the potential of representation. In short, it actually is funny. And not in an "in-joke" way, but in the classic slapstick way of people falling over, and wry observations about the complexities of modern womanhood."

Awards and nominations

References

External links
 
 

2018 British television series debuts
2010s British sitcoms
2010s British music television series
2010s British LGBT-related comedy television series
2020s British sitcoms
2020s British music television series
2020s British LGBT-related comedy television series
British LGBT-related sitcoms
British musical television series
Channel 4 sitcoms
English-language television shows
Islam in fiction
Lesbian-related television shows
Peacock (streaming service) original programming
Punk television series
Television series about fictional musicians
Television series by Working Title Television
Women in London